John Desmond Nisbet (29 October 1921 – 28 November 2004) was an Australian rules footballer who played with St Kilda in the Victorian Football League (VFL).

Nisbet, a defender, was originally from Rochester and also played football at Caulfield City prior to playing 110 games for St Kilda. 

Nisbet served in the Australian Army during World War II.

Nisbet was runner-up in the 1947 senior best and fairest award. He then served as coach of the St Kilda seconds. From 1958 to 1983 he was Chairman of Selectors for St Kilda. In 2008 he was inducted into the club's Hall of Fame.

His son, Darryl, played one game for St Kilda in the 1970 VFL season.

References

Links
1947 action photo of Des Nisbet

1921 births
Australian rules footballers from Melbourne
St Kilda Football Club players
St Kilda Football Club administrators
2004 deaths
Australian Army personnel of World War II
Australian Army soldiers
People from Caulfield, Victoria
Military personnel from Melbourne